Aldo Sebastián Cubilla Bogado (born January 8, 2001) is an American soccer player who plays as a left midfielder for Paraguayan Primera División side Club Sol de América.

Career

Club career
Born in the United States, however of Paraguayan origin, Cubilla is a product of Sol de América which he joined in 2008. On 14 July 2019, Cubilla got his official debut for Sol de América in the Paraguayan Primera División against Club Nacional, where he was in the starting lineup. Cubilla was also in the starting lineup in the following five matches in a row. He made a total of 7 appearances for the team in the 2019 season. In the 2020 season, Cubilla played no games for the first team and was only on the bench for one game.

References

External links
 

2001 births
Living people
Association football wingers
Citizens of Paraguay through descent
Paraguayan footballers
American soccer players
American people of Paraguayan descent
American sportspeople of Paraguayan descent
Sportspeople of Paraguayan descent
Paraguayan Primera División players
Club Sol de América footballers